The 1966–67 season was Manchester United's 65th season in the Football League, and their 22nd consecutive season in the top division of English football. They finished the season as league champions for the seventh time in their history and the fifth under the management of Matt Busby, but this would be their last top division title for 26 years.

United's top scorer this season was Denis Law, with 23 in the league and 25 in all competitions.

First Division

FA Cup

Football League Cup

Squad statistics

References

Manchester United F.C. seasons
Manchester United
1967